Guglielmo is the Italian form of the masculine name William.  It may refer to:

People with the given name Guglielmo:

 Guglielmo I Gonzaga (1538–1587), Duke of Mantua and Montferrat
 Guglielmo Achille Cavellini (1914–1990), influential Italian art collector and mail artist
 Guglielmo Agnelli (c. 1238 – 1313), Italian sculptor and architect
 Guglielmo Bergamesco (16th century), Italian architect
 Guglielmo Borremans (born 1672), Baroque painter
 Guglielmo Caccia (1568–1625), Italian painter
 Guglielmo da Leoni (c. 1664 – 1740), Italian painter and engraver
 Guglielmo da Marsiglia (1475–1537), Italian painter of stained glass
 Guglielmo della Porta (c. 1500 – 1577), Italian architect and sculptor
 Guglielmo della Scala (died 1404), Lord of Verona
 Guglielmo Ebreo da Pesaro (15th century), Italian dancing-master
 Guglielmo Embriaco (born c. 1040), Genoese merchant and military leader
 Guglielmo Ferrero (1871–1942), Italian historian, journalist and novelist
 Guglielmo Fiammingo (c. 1530 – 1587), sculptor
 Guglielmo Fieschi (13th century), Italian cardinal
 Guglielmo Gabetto (1916–1949), Italian former football (soccer) player
 Guglielmo il Giuggiola (16th century), Italian poet
 Guglielmo Letteri (1926–2006), Italian comic book artist
 Guglielmo Libri Carucci dalla Sommaja (1803–1869), Italian mathematician
 Guglielmo Marconi (1874–1937), Italian inventor
 Guglielmo Massaia (1809–1889), Italian Catholic missionary
 Guglielmo Nasi (1879–1971), Italian General
 Guglielmo Oberdan (1858–1882), Italian irredentist and terrorist
 Guglielmo Pallotta (1727–1795), Italian Roman Catholic Cardinal
 Guglielmo Pepe (1783–1855), Italian general and patriot
 Guglielmo Plüschow (1852–1930), German photographer
 Guglielmo Quarenghi (1826–1882), Italian composer
 Guglielmo Sanfelice d'Acquavilla (1834–1897), cardinal of the Roman Catholic Church
 Guglielmo Scheibmeier (21st century), Italian bobsledder
 Guglielmo Stendardo (born 1981), Italian football defender
 Guglielmo Verdirame (21st century), Italian lawyer
 Guglielmo Vicario (born 1996), Italian footballer
 Guglielmo Visconti (c. 1210 – 1276), Italian cardinal
 Niccolo Guglielmo Alforae, French engraver
 William Guglielmo Niederland (1904–1993), German-American psychoanalyst
 
People with the surname Guglielmo:

 Dudley A. Guglielmo (1909–2005), Louisiana insurance commissioner
 Mark Guglielmo (born 1968), American murderer

Italian masculine given names
Surnames from given names